Donna M. Walsh (born 1943) is an American politician who was a Democratic member of the Rhode Island House of Representatives, representing the 36th District from 2007 to 2015. She served on the House Committee on Corporations, and the House Committee on Environment and Natural Resources.

References

External links
Rhode Island House - Representative Donna M. Walsh official RI House website
RI Representative Donna M. Walsh 2010 Campaign Website for Donna M Walsh
Project Vote Smart - Representative Donna M. Walsh Project Vote Smart Report for Donna M Walsh

Democratic Party members of the Rhode Island House of Representatives
1943 births
Living people
People from Washington County, Rhode Island
Women state legislators in Rhode Island
21st-century American women